Mike Gierau (born March 18, 1959) is an American politician and who is a member of the Wyoming Senate. representing District 17 since 2019. A Democrat, he served in the Wyoming House of Representatives representing District 16 from 2017 until 2019.

Career
Prior to his election to the Wyoming House of Representatives, Gierau served on the Jackson Hole City Council and Teton County Board of Commissioners.  Gierau has been the owner of Jedediah Corporation in Jackson since 1980.

Gierau was one of four Wyoming superdelegates to the 2016 Democratic National Convention.  During the convention roll call, all four superdelegates endorsed Hillary Clinton for President over Bernie Sanders.

Elections

2016
When incumbent Republican Representative Ruth Petroff announced her retirement, Gierau announced his candidacy for the seat.  Gierau ran unopposed for the Democratic nomination and was unopposed for the general election.

2018
When incumbent Republican state senator Leland Christensen ran for state treasurer and did not seek reelection in the State Senate, Gierau ran to fill his seat. Gierau was unopposed in the Democratic primary, and defeated Republican Kate Mead in the general election.

References

External links
Profile from Ballotpedia

1959 births
Living people
County commissioners in Wyoming
Wyoming city council members
Democratic Party members of the Wyoming House of Representatives
Democratic Party Wyoming state senators
Politicians from Klamath Falls, Oregon
People from Jackson, Wyoming
San Francisco State University alumni
21st-century American politicians